(May 1, 1922 – September 26, 2005) was a Japanese physicist.

Hayashi was born in Tokyo in 1922 and graduated from the faculty of science, University of Tokyo in 1946. He worked as assistant professor at the Institute for Nuclear Research of the same university and defended his PhD in 1962. After the PhD defense, he stayed for a year at MIT, and between 1964 and 1971 worked at Bell Labs on semiconductor lasers. In 1971 he joined the Research Laboratories of NEC where he continued his studies of semiconductor lasers, aiming to improve their reliability and lifetime. Between 1982 and 1987 he was a head scientist at NEC and in 1987–1994 became director of the Optoelectronics Technology Research Laboratory in Tsukuba. From 1994 until retirement in 1996 he served as advisor in the same laboratory. Hayashi died of acute leukemia in 2005.

Awards and honors
Fujihara Award, Japan (1946)
Prize from Institute of Electronics and Communication Engineers, Japan (1975)
J J Ebers Award, IEEE (1984)
Asahi Prize, Japan (1986)
C&C Prize (with Morton B. Panish), Japan (1986)
IEEE David Sarnoff Award (1988)
Marconi Prize (1993)
Applied Physics Society Prize, Japan (2001)
Kyoto Prize, Japan (2001)

References

1922 births
2005 deaths
Japanese physicists
NEC people
University of Tokyo alumni
Academic staff of the University of Tokyo
Scientists at Bell Labs
Japanese expatriates in the United States
Kyoto laureates in Advanced Technology